In the human larynx, the cuneiform cartilages (from Latin: cunei, "wedge-shaped"; also known as cartilages of Wrisberg) are two small, elongated pieces of yellow elastic cartilage, placed one on either side, in the aryepiglottic fold.

The cuneiforms are paired cartilages that sit on top of and move with the arytenoids.  They are located above and in front of the corniculate cartilages, and the presence of these two pairs of cartilages result in small bulges on the surface of the mucous membrane.
Covered by the aryepiglottic folds, the cuneiforms form the lateral aspect of the laryngeal inlet, while the corniculates form the posterior aspect, and the epiglottis the anterior.

Function of the cuneiform cartilages is to support the vocal folds and lateral aspects of the epiglottis.  They also provide a degree of solidity to the folds in which they are embedded.

Additional images

References

Human head and neck